Kaibara may refer to:
 Kaibara Ekken (1630-1714), a Japanese Neo-Confucian philosopher and botanist
 Kaibara, Hyōgo, a former town located in Hikami District, Hyōgo, Japan.